Mr. California is an American men's leisurewear clothing line based in Santa Cruz, California. Founded in 1962, the brand today specializes in a modern take on the classic styles that Mr. California first created back in the 1960s.

Product line

Mr. California's current line features long- and short-sleeve woven shirts, knit shirts, jackets, pajamas, hats and T-shirts with illustrations inspired by Mid-Century Modernism.

History

Mr. California introduced knit and woven shirts in the early sixties, marketing them as "leisurewear" for men on the go. The shirts had a number of unique features, including the square cut finish, dual front pockets and dual buttons on the sleeves. Each shirt also sported a heraldic crest on the front placket, which became a defining symbol of the brand itself. The crests ranged from a simple fleur-de-lys to decorative crowns to mythical animals all embroidered into each shirt.

The line also featured a waist-buttoned "Jack Shirt," Cuban-inspired Guayaberas and Polo shirts.

In the 70's, the brand turned its attention to attenuated collars and garish colors in order to service the rapidly evolving disco movement.

In the 80's, the brand turned away from its classic leisurewear roots by creating a new division offering a product called "The Bentley." The final Mr. California shirts marketed by the original incarnation of the company were last seen in the late ‘80's at JCPenney's in Glendale, California. Then the brand went dormant.

Over forty years after Mr. California first appeared on store shelves, a group of classic menswear enthusiasts stepped forward to re-release the brand with the intention of bringing Mr. California back to its 1960's success. Since then, the new Mr. California lines features clothing inspired by the original designs, but updated to suit modern men.

External links

References

Clothing companies of the United States